Černé Voděrady is a municipality and village in Prague-East District in the Central Bohemian Region of the Czech Republic. It has about 300 inhabitants.

History
The first written mention of Černé Voděrady is from 1291.

References

External links

Villages in Prague-East District